The 1926–27 California Golden Bears men's basketball team represented the University of California, Berkeley in intercollegiate basketball during the 1926–27 season. The team finished the season with a 17–0 record and was retroactively named the national champion by the Premo-Porretta Power Poll. It was head coach Nibs Price's third season coaching the team.

References

California Golden Bears men's basketball seasons
NCAA Division I men's basketball tournament championship seasons
California
California Golden Bears Men's Basketball Team
California Golden Bears Men's Basketball Team